Family Karma is an American reality television series that premiered on Bravo on March 8, 2020.

The show chronicles the lives of several Indian-American families over three generations who relocated to the Miami, Florida area around the same time.

Cast

Main
 Brian Benni
 Bali Chainani
 Amrit Kapai
 Vishal Parvani
 Anisha Ramakrishna
 Monica Vaswani
 Rish Karam

Recurring
 Richa Sadana
 Nicholas Kouchoukos
 Shaan Patel (season 2; season 1)
 Nick Benni (guest season 2; guest season 1)
 Dillon Patel (season 2; guest season 1)
 Monica Shah (season 2)

Episodes

Series overview

Season 1 (2020)

Season 2 (2021)

Season 3 (2022–23)

References

External links
 

2020s American reality television series
2020 American television series debuts
English-language television shows
Bravo (American TV network) original programming
Indian-American culture in Florida
Indian-American culture
Television shows set in Miami
Television series by Endemol